Biljača is a village in the municipality of Bujanovac, Serbia. According to the 2002 census, the settlement has a population of 2036 people. Of these, 1704 (83,69 %) were ethnic Albanians, 163 	(8,00 %) were Serbs, 8 	(0,39 %) Turkish, 2 (0,09 %) Hungarians, 2 (0,09 %) Macedonians, and 16 	(0,78 %) others.

References

Populated places in Pčinja District
Albanian communities in Serbia